The Alabama or Alibamu are a Southeastern culture people of Native Americans, originally from Alabama. They were members of the Muscogee Creek Confederacy, a loose trade and military organization of autonomous towns; their home lands were on the upper Alabama River.

The Alabama and closely allied Coushatta people migrated from Alabama and Mississippi to the area of Texas in the late 18th century and early 19th century, under pressure from European-American settlers to the east. They essentially merged and shared reservation land. Although the tribe was terminated in the 1950s, it achieved federal recognition in 1987 as the Alabama-Coushatta Tribe of Texas.

The Alabama-Quassarte Tribal Town is a federally recognized tribe, headquartered in Wetumka, Oklahoma.

Language
The Alabama language is part of the Muskogean language family. Alabama is closely related to Koasati and distantly to Hitchiti, Chickasaw and Choctaw. Also known as Alibamu, an estimated 100 speakers, primarily from Texas, still speak the language.

History 

The Alabama first encountered Europeans when Hernando de Soto arrived in 1540 and visited numerous places during his expedition. In the 18th century, the French arrived on the Gulf Coast and built a fort at what became Mobile, Alabama.

The Alibamu and Koasati tribes were part of the Creek Confederacy. They had less contact with British colonists from the Thirteen Colonies than other Creek tribes did. They were the first to migrate away when British colonists began to settle in the region by the middle of the 18th century, after the land was ceded by the French following Britain's victory in the Seven Years' War (known in the colonies as the French and Indian War). Under pressure as well by Native American enemies, the Alabama and Coushatta tribes wanted to avoid the powerful Choctaw in present-day Mississippi. They moved into territories of future states, first into Louisiana and then into Texas.

Alabama and Coushatta towns were divided into "red" and "white" towns. The "white" towns were responsible for keeping the peace and for providing refuge, while the "red" towns were responsible for conducting military campaigns. Though they had "red" and "white" towns, the Alabama-Coushattas thought of themselves as peace-loving people.

In 1795, the Coushatta arrived in the Big Thicket area of East Texas. In 1805, nearly 1,000 Alabama came to Tyler County's Peach Tree Village in East Texas. The two tribes developed a strong friendship as they roamed and hunted their new land together. In the early 19th century, the Texas Congress granted each tribe two strips of land along the Trinity River. Their land was soon taken over by European-American settlers, leaving them homeless. Sam Houston, the governor of Texas, recommended that the state purchase  for the Alabamas; although money was appropriated to buy  for the Coushattas, the land was never bought. Either through marriage or special permission, many Coushatta went to live on the land given to the Alabama. Other Coushatta had stayed in an area in southern Louisiana near the Red River. Many of their descendants are enrolled members of the federally recognized Coushatta Tribe of Louisiana.

By 1820, there were three main Alabama towns and three large Coushatta towns in east Texas, in the region known as the Big Thicket. In 1854, the Alabama were given 1,280 acres (5 km2) in Polk County. The following year, 640 acres (2.6 km2), also in Polk County, were given to the Coushattas. The Coushatta claim was disputed by white settlers in 1859. When the Coushatta lost the land claim, the Alabama invited them to live on their land claim.

The federal government approved a large grant in 1928 to purchase additional land near the reservation; it was granted to the "Alabama and Coushatta tribes". Since that time, the reservation has officially been known as "Alabama-Coushatta".

Origin myths focus on the interconnectedness of the tribes. One myth states that the two tribes sprouted from either side of a cypress tree. Another legend was recorded in 1857 from Se-ko-pe-chi, one of the oldest Creeks in Indian Territory. He said that the tribes "sprang out of the ground between the Cohawba and Alabama Rivers." The symbol of the Alabama-Coushatta tribe comes from pre-contact Mississippian culture: two intertwined woodpeckers, now symbolic of the connection between the two tribes.

Cultural practices

Ethnobotany
The obtusifolium subspecies of the plant Pseudognaphalium obtusifolium is used in a compound decoction  for nervousness and sleepiness, and in a decoction as a face wash for nerves and insomnia.

Contemporary tribes

Texas

The Alabama who relocated to Texas supported Texas independence. In gratitude, Governor Sam Houston recommended that Texas purchase land for the tribe when their existing land was overtaken by settlers.

The two tribes share many cultural characteristics. In a hearing before the Indian Claims Commission in 1974, Dr. Daniel Jacobson suggested that the Alabama and Coushatta tribes were culturally related because of intermarriage. The Handbook of Texas reports that the languages come from the same stock, even though there could be some word variance.

They merged with the Coushatta to become the present-day Alabama-Coushatta Tribe of Texas. Although long under state trusteeship because the state controlled public lands, the tribe achieved Federal recognition in 1987 by an act of Congress, rather than by administrative process of the Department of Interior. The law that restored the tribe's federal relationship prohibited such gaming as was then prohibited under state laws.

The current tribal lands are in eastern Polk County, Texas. The land purchased by the state and assigned to the Alabama in 1854 was expanded by another purchase, under a federal grant in 1928. The 2000 census reported a resident population of 480 persons within the reservation. As of 2010, there are some 1000 members of the Alabama-Coushatta tribe.

Oklahoma

In Okmulgee County, Oklahoma, the Alabama-Quassarte Tribal Town was established and federally recognized in 1936. The descendants of the Alabama who live there are also affiliated with the federally recognized Muscogee Creek Nation.

Tribal economy and gaming
In the tribe's earlier years in Texas, gathering, hunting, agriculture, fishing, and trading were its main economic pursuits. In more recent years, the Alabama-Coushatta Tribe has relied on the service and entertainment industry to generate revenue and jobs on the reservation. In 2002, the Tribe opened a convenience store, gas station and tobacco store on U.S. Highway 190, which can sell products tax free because of the tribe's sovereign status. This business complex is slowly becoming profitable. The station generates a small profit margin and a limited number of jobs.

The Tribe opened an entertainment center for tourists. The center offered casino gambling. The tribe believed it satisfied requirements of the 1992 Texas Lottery Law that permitted the state lottery, horse racing, and dog racing. The Alabama-Coushatta, a Christian community, allows no alcohol in the casino.

The Tribe was successful in generating revenue and jobs. The center offered jobs to 87 Tribal members, greatly reducing unemployment from 46 percent to 14 percent. Revenues from the entertainment center provided the Tribe with funding for health services, the elderly, educational opportunities for youth, social services, and housing. Such jobs had a multiplier effect within the regional economy, with businesses' reporting an increase in sales and tax revenues. The entertainment center benefited not only the Tribe, but also the surrounding regions by creating more than 495 jobs and paying US$4.3 million in wages and nearly US$400,000 in federal taxes.

After the center had operated for nine months, the state brought suit against it in 1999. A Federal court ruled that the Alabama-Coushatta had to close their entertainment center. The federal courts made this determination based on the conditions of federal recognition in 1987, which banned tribes from gaming prohibited under state laws.

In July 2006 the Alabama-Coushatta sued lobbyist Jack Abramoff and his associates for attempts to defraud the tribe in seeking to defeat state legislation in 2001 that would have given them authority to run the casino. The tribe claimed the lobbyists had hidden their motives in representing the competing Coushatta of Louisiana, which ran their own casino, and mobilized Christian groups in an underhanded way. A Senate investigation in 2006 revealed that several tribes were defrauded of tens of millions of dollars by Abramoff and associates on issues associated with Indian gaming.

The four tribes that Abramoff persuaded to hire him were all newly wealthy Indian gaming tribes. They included: Michigan's Saginaw Chippewa, California's Agua Caliente, the Mississippi Choctaw, and the Louisiana Coushatta. The Abramoff scandal received widespread public attention and he was prosecuted.

On March 29, 2008, Jack Abramoff was sentenced to five years and ten months in prison for pleading guilty to fraud, tax evasion, and conspiracy to bribe public officials. Abramoff made a deal to cooperate with investigators to provide information about his relationships with several members of Congress. Federal sentencing guidelines indicated a minimum sentence of 108 months in prison. Because of Abramoff's cooperation with the government, his sentence was greatly reduced. He was released from prison on June 8, 2010 and completed the remaining six months of his sentence in a halfway house in Baltimore.

Without the casino, the tribe has no funding for economic programs. More than 300 jobs have been lost in Polk County. The Alabama-Coushatta tribe has been trying to gain state and Federal support to re-open the entertainment center, for the economy of both the Tribe and the surrounding regions. Over the years, the Tribe has struggled to rebuild its  economy in a depressed Polk County.

We should be candid about the interests surrounding Indian gaming. The issue has never really been one of crime control, morality, or economic fairness...At issue is economics...Ironically, the strongest opponents of tribal authority over gaming on Indian lands are from States whose liberal gaming policies would allow them to compete on an equal basis with the tribes...We must not impose greater moral restraints on Indians than we do on the rest of our citizenry. - Daniel Inouye, senior United States senator from Hawaii.

The Indian Gaming Regulatory Act (IGRA), passed by Congress in 1988 (after the act that restored federal recognition to the Alabama-Coushatta), established the framework that governs Indian gaming. The IGRA allows tribes to develop casino-style operations that could improve governmental services and economic conditions in Indian country. According to the IGRA, tribes have the "exclusive right" to regulate gaming in Indian Territory "except when gambling is contrary to federal law or when a state completely prohibits a form of gaming." The IGRA recognizes three different classes of gaming:
Class I Gaming: Includes traditional tribal gambling, such as stick and bone games
Class II Gaming: Includes bingo, pull tabs, etc.
Class III Gaming: Includes large-scale gambling operations

Class I gaming is controlled completely by the tribes. Class II gaming is regulated by the tribes with oversight by the National Indian Gaming Commission. Class III gaming may be allowed in a state that allows large-scale gambling operations, even if it allows only low-level operations. Also, Class III gaming is subject to agreed regulatory procedures in Tribal-State compacts, which states are required to negotiate in "good faith". Without a tribal-state compact, no tribal casino can be permitted.

Tribes find fault with the provision about Tribal-State compacts, because under the Eleventh Amendment, which provides for state sovereign immunity, tribes are not able to sue any state to enforce the requirement to enter into such compacts. Thus, while the IGRA gives tribes the right to have casinos, the Eleventh Amendment gives the states the right to refuse to negotiate tribal-state compacts.

The Indian Gaming Regulatory Act requires that gaming revenues be used only for governmental or charitable purposes. The tribal governments determine how gaming revenues are spent. They are typically used to invest in infrastructure for tribal members, such as housing, schools, and roads; to fund health care and education; and to develop a strong economy.

Indian gaming is considered the most powerful economic development tool available on most Indian reservations. The National Gaming Impact Study Commission has stated that "no...economic development other than gaming has been found." Tribal governments also use gaming revenues to develop other economic enterprises, such as museums, malls, and cultural centers that attract tourists and other visitors. Indian gaming can provide substantial economic benefits in states where a tribe and state work together.

Notes

See also

 List of Native American peoples in the United States

References

 Grant, Bruce. Concise Encyclopedia of the American Indian, New York: Wings Books, 2000 (3rd Edition)
 Waldman, Carl. Encyclopedia of Native American Tribes, New York: Checkmark, 1999. 
Alabama-Coushatta Reservation, Texas United States Census Bureau
Jacobson, Daniel, Howard N. Martin, and Ralph Henry Marsh. (Creek) Indians Alabama-Coushatta, New York: Garland Publishing, Inc., 1974.
LaVere, David. The Texas Indians, College Station: Texas A&M University Press, 2004.
"Alabama Indians", Texas State Handbook Online
 "The Legend of the Twin Manifestations" , Alabama-Coushatta Official Website
"Tribal History" , Alabama-Coushatta Official Website
"Alabama-Coushatta Tribe Seeks Gaming Support", 24 June 2008, Indianz.com, Accessed 2 Oct 2008
"Plaintiff Alabama-Coushatta Tribe of Texas's Original Complaint", 12 July 2006, Attorneys For Plaintiff, accessed 2 Oct 2008
Schmidt, James Grimaldi, R. Jeffrey Smith. "Investigating Abramoff." The Washington Post Online 29 Mar 2006 14 Nov 2008 <https://www.washingtonpost.com/wp-dyn/content/linkset/2005/06/22/LI2005062200936.html>.
Schmidt, Susan. "A Jackpot from Indian Gaming Tribes." The Washington Post Online 22 Feb 2004 14 Nov 2008 <https://www.washingtonpost.com/wp-dyn/content/article/2006/03/06/AR2006030600702.html>.
Schmitt, Richard. "Jack Abramoff Sentenced to 48 Months." Los Angeles Times 05 Sep 2008 21 Nov 2008 <http://articles.latimes.com/2008/sep/05/nation/na-abramoff5>.

External links
Alabama-Coushatta Tribe of Texas
Alabama Quassarte Tribal Town of Oklahoma
Native American Graves Protection and Repatriation Act, notice returning artifacts to Alabama-Quasserte and others 

Muskogean tribes
South Appalachian Mississippian culture
Native American tribes in Oklahoma
Native American tribes in Texas
Native American tribes in Alabama